Rudyard may refer to:

Places
Rudyard, Mississippi, United States, an unincorporated community
Rudyard, Montana, United States, a census-designated place
Rudyard Township, Michigan, United States
Rudyard, Staffordshire, England, a village
 Rudyard Lake, in Rudyard, Staffordshire, a reservoir

Given names
Harald Rudyard Engman (1903–1968), Danish artist, painter
Rudyard Griffiths (born 1970), TV anchor
Rudyard Kipling (1865–1936), English author and poet
Rudyard Spencer (born 1944), Jamaican politician and Minister of Health

Surnames

Benjamin Rudyard (1572–1658), an English poet and politician
Carol Rudyard (1922–2021), English-Australian visual artist
John Rudyard (1650-c.1718), second builder of the Eddystone Lighthouse (1708)
Thomas Rudyard (1640–1692), first deputy governor of East New Jersey

See also
Ridyard, a surname derived from Rudyard, Staffordshire